Naarda symethusalis is a species of moth in the family Noctuidae first described by Francis Walker in 1859.

References

Herminiinae
Moths described in 1859